Auguste Delaherche (27 December 1857 – 27 June 1940) was a French ceramicist, who was a leading figure in French art pottery through the Art Nouveau period.  Like other leading French potters of the period, he was intensely interested in ceramic glaze effects of colour and surface texture.  He began his career making stoneware, but later also made porcelain in his studio.  

After some years potting in Paris, in 1894 he returned to his native region, and ten years later changed his operation to a one-man studio pottery.  He also moved in stages from making exclusively stoneware to only making porcelain.

Career
He trained at the École des Arts Décoratifs in Paris.  At the start of his career he worked in other artistic media, restoring stained glass, designing "religious jewellery" and as head of the electroplating department at the firm of Christofle in Paris, who had pioneered the technique. He began potting with salt-glazed stoneware in 1883 near Beauvais, and in 1887 bought the atelier of Ernest Chaplet in rue Blomet, Paris.  Chaplet had moved to Choisy-le-Roi in the suburbs.

Initially he made stoneware pieces in several versions, and did not do the throwing himself, giving drawings to assistants.  His pieces were almost all vases of one sort or another.  He preferred relatively simple basic shapes, often augmented with bold ribs or handles, concentrating on the surface effects, especially high-temperature "flambé" glazes.  His work came to the notice of other potters at the exhibition held by the Union Centrale des Arts Décoratifs in 1887, and then won prizes at the Paris Exposition Universelle of 1889.  He won gold medals at both, and the Exposition Universelle of 1900, again in Paris. 

In 1894 he left Paris and set up his workshop at "Les Sables Rouges", in the hamlet of Armentières, Oise, near the village of Lachapelle-aux-Pots, and his hometown of Beauvais, and in the traditional stoneware potting district of the Pays de Bray.  He was rarely seen in Paris thereafter, though his pieces continued to be sold at the top galleries there, and as a result he acquired in the Paris art scene something of a myth as a rural "hermit".  He also began to make porcelain pieces. 

In 1904 there was a major change in his way of working, as he became, in modern terms, a studio potter.  He let go his assistants, and thereafter made unique pieces, mostly (and eventually all) in porcelain, carrying out all the stages of production himself.  He was said to use clay dug from his own garden, and according to Bernard Leach, he only fired his kiln once a year, remaining awake for thirty hours to ensure the correct temperature was maintained. The former claim must only refer to stoneware, as the region's clay is very suitable for this, and it is where it was first made in France, but the clay lacks the kaolin needed for porcelain.  Indeed, pottery clay was still being extracted commercially at Armentières in 1974.  

He was created a "chevalier" of the Légion d'honneur in 1894, with the painter René Ménard as sponsor, and in 1920 promoted to "officier".

Legacy
His bust by Pierre Félix Masseau is in the Musée départemental de l'Oise (MUDO) in Beauvais, which also claims to have the "most important" collection of his ceramics.  The Musée de la Poterie de La Chapelle aux Pots has a collection.  Other large museum collections have examples, especially in France, the United States, and Britain.  One group assembled by the American collector, Ellen Dexter Sharpe (1861–1963), who corresponded with Delaherche, has mostly ended up in the Rhode Island School of Design Museum.

Notes

References
"Beauvais": PDF history of Beauvais ceramics, Office de Tourisme de l’Agglomération de Beauvais (in French) 
"Grove": "Delaherche, Auguste", in The Grove Encyclopedia of Decorative Arts, Volume 1 of two-volume set, ed. Gordon Campbell, p. 307, 2006, Oxford University Press, USA, 9780195189483, google books
"MUDO": "Vase à six côtes verticales, Auguste DELAHERCHE – 1892", Musée départemental de l'Oise
"Orsay": biography, Musée d'Orsay
Sullivan, Elizabeth, "French Art Pottery", In Heilbrunn Timeline of Art History, The Metropolitan Museum of Art, 2014, online
Tornier, Etienne, "Auguste Delaherche et les Etats-Unis (1889–1953)" (in French), in Bulletin du groupe de recherches et d'études de la céramique du Beauvaisis (GRECB), 2012, PDF on Academia.edu
"V&A": biography from the Victoria & Albert Museum

Further reading
 Marie-José Salmon, Auguste Delaherche (1857–1940), exhibition catalogue, musée départemental de l'Oise, Beauvais 29 mai-15 septembre 1973, Beauvais
 Josette Galiègue, Helen Bieri Thomson, Bernard Giguet, Jean Cartier : Auguste Delaherche: rêves d'argile, secrets d'émail, exhibition catalogue (Fondation Neumann, Gingins, Suisse, 2001), Paris, Somogy, 2001 
 Apprivoiser le feu, by Marie-Madeleine Massé, in : Hélène Sirven, Josette Galiègue, et al., L'Idéal Art nouveau : une collection majeure du musée départemental de l'Oise, Paris, Éditions Gallimard, 2013 
 Bernard Giguet : Auguste Delaherche, 2001, Bulletin n° 21 du GRECB (Groupe de recherches et d'études de la céramique du Beauvaisis).

French ceramists
French potters
Art pottery
1857 births
1940 deaths
People from Beauvais
Art Nouveau